Cherche fiancé tous frais payés is a 2007 French film directed by Aline Issermann.

Cast
 Alexandra Lamy : Alexandra
 Bruno Salomone : Yann / Manuel
 Claudia Cardinale : Elisabeth
 Isabelle Gélinas : Marie
 Gilles Gaston-Dreyfus : Bernard
 Mathias Mlekuz : Christian
 Rachida Khalil : Vanessa
 Mélissa Verstraeten : Eglantine
 Zélie Jobert : Marion
 Blandine Bellavoir : Paloma
 Christian Brendel : François
 Jean-Claude Adelin : Gérard
 Jacques Zabor : The director
 Jean Dujardin : The nightclub animator

References

External links
 

2007 films
French comedy films
2000s French-language films
2000s French films